Viktor Nikolaevich Suslin (born 19 July 1944) is a retired Russian rower who specialized in the eights. In this event he won bronze medals at the 1968 Summer Olympics and 1967 European Championships and a silver at the 1966 World Rowing Championships. His elder brother Yury is also a retired Olympic rower.

References

External links
 

1944 births
Living people
Soviet male rowers
Olympic rowers of the Soviet Union
Rowers at the 1968 Summer Olympics
Olympic bronze medalists for the Soviet Union
Olympic medalists in rowing
Medalists at the 1968 Summer Olympics
World Rowing Championships medalists for the Soviet Union
European Rowing Championships medalists